Esteghlal F.C. is an Iranian professional association football club base in Tehran. The club was formed in Ferdowsi Street, central Tehran in 26 September 1945 as Docharkhesavaran and was renamed to Taj F.C. in 11 February 1950. In spring of 1979 and only a few weeks after the Iranian revolution the club was renamed to its current name, Esteghlal F.C.

Ali Danaeifard is the first manager in the club's history. Danaifard managed Taj in 3 separate spells. As of 2020-21 season there have been 40 managers in 65 separate spells managing the club.

Notable managers 

Only managers who have won official trophies are listed.

Key

Managers 

 Statistics are complete up to and including the match played on 6 March 2023.

Key

 M = matches played; W = matches won; D = matches drawn; L = matches lost; GF = Goals for; GA = Goals against; Win % = percentage of total matches won
  Managers with this background in the "Name" column are italicised to denote caretaker appointments.

See also 
 List of Esteghlal F.C. records and statistics
 List of Esteghlal F.C. honours

Footnotes

References 

Esteghlal F.C.
 
Esteghlal Tehran